A district or raion in Belarus is the second-level administrative division in the country which are subordinate to regions (also known as oblasts or voblasts).

List

References

External links

 
Districts, Belarus